Peer Pressure is an American television game show where youths performed stunts and answered questions about moral dilemmas. The show aired in syndication from 1997-1998 in first-run (with re-edited repeats airing until 2000), and was hosted by Nick Spano   and Valarie Rae Miller.

Gameplay
Three youths, ages 12–17, competed in this game, whose centerpiece was a life-sized board game spread out on the studio floor. One at a time, each contestant determined his/her moves via a "Magic 8 ball", which reveals a type of activity (a stunt or a moral-based question) and the number of spaces the contestant can move upon a correct answer or completion of said stunt. Landing on a "Move Ahead" space allowed the contestant to move ahead two more spaces. He/she had to move back two spaces upon landing on "Go Back". However, if the contestant ended up on those spaces when being assessed a penalty, he/she was not allowed to follow its instructions.

Activities
Four different activities were possible:

 Decision – The contestant and a "Peer Group" (a jury composed of about 10-12 teenagers in the studio audience) were read a moral dilemma-type question (e.g., "She's a really pretty, petite young blonde, but often wears plain white T-shirts and blue jeans to school because that's what she likes to wear. Does she turn you off because she dresses like a tomboy?") The contestant, without knowing how the Peer Group voted, supplied his/her answer and often gave some reasoning. If the response agreed with the consensus of the Peer Group, the contestant advanced.
 Odd Job – The player performed a stunt (such as sorting clothing by type into the appropriate laundry basket), and had to meet the goal in a time limit to move.
 Temptation – A prize is described. The contestant could take the prize and accept a two-step penalty, or pass it up and advance. If the contestant took the prize, it was theirs to keep regardless of the outcome of the game. (In at least one instance, a third-place contestant declined the Temptation prize only to find out that it was the last activity of the game and he would have finished in third place either way; the contestant was given the prize anyway.)
 Fast Track – Similar to "Odd Job", except the stunt is more difficult and always worth eight steps (e.g., preparing three banana split sundaes on a moving conveyor belt within a time limit). Even if the contestant failed, they got a two-space consolation move.

After each contestant has taken a turn, the host asked a "Pop Quiz" question. Correct answers allowed that player to advance three spaces, while a wrong answer (or failing to answer) meant a three-step penalty.

Bonus Round: "The Pressure Cooker"
After an undefined time limit, the player making the least progress was eliminated from further play. The remaining contestants advanced to the "Pressure Cooker" round, which were yes/no dilemmas (played just like "Decision"), asked in an alternating format; the player who had made the most progress on the board had the advantage of going first. The first contestant to guess three questions correctly won the game and bonus prizes.

Broadcast 
The series aired original episodes for one season in 1997–98. However, the series aired repackaged reruns in the 1998–99 and 1999–2000 television seasons; the first season of reruns edited out references to the "Magic 8 Ball" and added Pop-Up Video-style commentaries. The second season of reruns repackaged the series as Pressure 2 (to accompany the new spin-off series Pressure 1) by means of on-screen graphics and editing out references to "Peer" when the title was spoken.

1990s American children's game shows
1997 American television series debuts
1998 American television series endings
Television series about children
Television series about teenagers